Carlota Gooden (born 7 June 1936) is a Panamanian sprinter. She was the first woman to represent Panama at the Olympics.

She competed in the women's 100 metres at the 1960 Summer Olympics. She finished second in the 1959 Pan American Games 4 × 100 metres Relay (with Jean Holmes-Mitchell, Marcela Daniel, and Silvia Hunte), third in the 1959 Pan American Games 60 metres and third in the 1959 Pan American Games 100 metres. She was descended from Barbadian canal workers. In 1955, she earned an athletic scholarship to Tuskegee University, one of the premier African American women’s track programs.

References

External links
 

1936 births
Living people
Athletes (track and field) at the 1960 Summer Olympics
Panamanian female sprinters
Olympic athletes of Panama
Athletes (track and field) at the 1959 Pan American Games
Pan American Games silver medalists for Panama
Pan American Games bronze medalists for Panama
Pan American Games medalists in athletics (track and field)
Competitors at the 1954 Central American and Caribbean Games
Central American and Caribbean Games gold medalists for Panama
Sportspeople from Panama City
Panamanian people of Barbadian descent
Tuskegee University alumni
Central American and Caribbean Games medalists in athletics
Medalists at the 1959 Pan American Games
Olympic female sprinters
20th-century Panamanian women
21st-century Panamanian women